Marion Saunders (born 1960), is a female former diver who competed for Great Britain and England. Saunders represented Great Britain at the 1980 Summer Olympics. She also represented England in the 10 metres platform, at the 1978 Commonwealth Games in Christchurch, New Zealand.

References

1960 births
Living people
English female divers
Divers at the 1978 Commonwealth Games
Olympic divers of Great Britain
Divers at the 1980 Summer Olympics
Commonwealth Games competitors for England